This is a list of characters from the American animated television series Duck Dodgers.

Galactic Protectorate

Duck Dodgers

Captain Daffy Edgar Dumas Aloysius Eoghain "the Duck" Dodgers is the star of the show. He was voiced by Joe Alaskey.

Duck Dodgers was accidentally frozen for over three centuries. He was revived by Dr. I.Q. Hi in the middle of the 24th century. Through scheming and lies, he managed to trick everyone into believing he was a 21st-century hero. In reality, he was only a water boy for a football team. He is arrogant, rude, selfish, greedy, lazy, cowardly, gullible, and not particularly intelligent. He occasionally displays surprisingly high levels of heroism and competence, suggesting that he is not quite as daft as he appears to be, although he mostly succeeds through dumb luck and the work of the Eager Young Space Cadet. Ironically, Commander X-2 actually caused Dodgers to become a minor football star in the final game of the season, which is what he used to parlay himself into captaincy in the Protectorate, meaning that he is, technically, not lying when he claims he won a championship football game in his own time. His running gag tends to be that he develops crushes on various women, who almost always hate him.

Cadet

Eager Young Space Cadet Porky C. Joey "the Pig" Paide is the faithful sidekick of Duck Dodgers. He was voiced by Bob Bergen.

Cadet looks up to Dodgers, seeing him as a father-figure in many ways. He is utterly loyal to Dodgers and doesn't doubt a word he says. Despite being much smarter than his so-called hero, Cadet lets Dodgers give all the orders. Dodgers cares deeply for Cadet, though he rarely shows it. Dodgers relies heavily on the Cadet's assistance and would likely fail most missions without it; he often tries to take credit for the Cadet's work.

Cadet is also fairly successful as a ladies man, often being the one who gets the girl Dodgers swoons over. He graduated summa cum laude from the Protectorate Academy. Very little else is known about his past, though one episode portrays him as being the Prince and Ruler of his home planet of Swinus 9. Another episode reveals that Cadet's sister was sold to the sausage factory (by Dodgers), and villains trying to dethrone or otherwise eliminate him. However, Cadet reveals this background by telling a story to his overly rambunctious niece and nephews who expressed no prior knowledge of this. It is unknown whether or not this is true or just his attempt to impress his relatives. He claimed to Count Muerte that he ended world hunger, though this could be seen as bragging to a stranger.

I.Q. Hi
Dr. Ignatius Q. "I.Q." Hi is the scientist that revives Dodgers after being frozen for three centuries. He is the Chief Scientist for the Galactic Protectorate and usually acts as a representative on Earth on behalf of the World President. Hi is responsible for giving missions to the team. Serious and hard-working, he is often irritated and frustrated with Dodgers's incompetent side, and doubts that Dodgers truly was a 21st-century hero. Once a year, he serves as a cadet for one flight on Dodger's ship in order to evaluate Dodger's command. In college, he majored in Pointless Minutiae, which his mother warned him against. He also has a slight potassium deficiency.

I.Q. Hi first appeared in Duck Dodgers in the 24½th Century, as the Secretary of the Stratosphere who briefs Duck Dodgers. He also appeared in the sequel, Duck Dodgers and the Return of the 24½th Century. In both cartoons, he was voiced by Mel Blanc. His overall design was changed in the TV series. In the shorts, he was originally fat and wore a blue laboratory coat. In the new series Hi wears a traditional white lab coat and is rarely seen without gloves that extend to his elbow and leave a gap between his fingertips and the glove's tips. He also has a higher-pitched, more throaty voice which was provided by Richard McGonagle. Hi is bald beneath his lightbulb-hat.

Later episodes also show that I.Q. Hi owns an old castle inherited from his ancestors (which is later destroyed by Dodgers), enjoys lattes, fishing, and despite their rivalries, appears to be on friendly terms with Queen Tyr'ahnee. He also has a brother named Psy Q. Hi, who is a psychiatrist.

Dr. I.Q. Hi may be loosely based on the character of Dr. Huer in the Buck Rogers comic strip that Dodgers parodies. Hi's physical appearance mimics that of Larry Fine.

In addition to the Duck Dodgers series, I.Q. Hi also made a guest cameo on Tiny Toon Adventures in the segment "Duck Dodgers, Jr.", featured in the episode "The Return to the Acme Acres Zone". Here, he briefs Dodgers and Plucky Duck (appearing as Dodgers' sidekick) on the matter transmogrifier that Marvin is using to suck up the universe; he is then sucked up himself by the transmogrifier. In this cameo, I.Q. Hi's appearance, voiced by Jeff Bergman, was closer to that of the original cartoons.

Dr. I.Q. Hi also appeared in the Super Nintendo Entertainment System title Daffy Duck: The Marvin Missions in which he appeared briefly in some in-between stage newspaper headline photos and (possibly) briefs Dodgers on his mission before each stage. He later appears as a boss, brainwashed by Marvin the Martian and strapped into a large war machine on the third planet's final area. The newspaper headline after the battle depicts I.Q. Hi (still under the effects of being brainwashed) being recruited as Dodgers' new cadet.

Captain Star Johnson
Captain Star Johnson is a member of the Space Protectorate who serves as a rival to Duck Dodgers.

Johnson is a rival captain of Dodger's in the Galactic Protectorate. Johnson has a University education and played collegiate rocketball. His personality is like that of Flash Gordon. Johnson once took Dodgers to court over Dodger's incompetence. Since then, Johnson has been involved in freeing Mars from the military coup by General Z9 and searching for gangsters when Dodgers went missing for a brief period of time.

Captain Long
Captain Long is a member of the Galactic Protectorate. He appeared in "The Fudd" where he was one of the victims of the Mother Fudd. He was voiced by Michael Dorn.

Captain Dallas Rodman
Captain Dallas Rodman is a member of the Galactic Protectorate. Rodman appeared in only one episode, "The Best of Captains, The Worst of Captains" where he was nominated for Captain of the Year at the Galactic Protectorate's Captainee Awards. He closely resembled Buzz Lightyear. Rodman was voiced by Frank Welker.

Captain Aurora Soleil
Captain Aurora Soleil served as a lieutenant in the Galactic Protectorate. At the Captainee Awards, Duck Dodgers and Star Johnson competed for her attention. At the awards, she was promoted to Captain for her heroic actions. Cadet voted for her in the "Captain of the Year" category. Soleil is based on Wilma Deering.

Master Sergeant Emily Dickinson Jones
Master Sergeant Emily Dickinson Jones works at the Galactic Protectorate Training Academy on Earth. He is responsible for monitoring Duck Dodgers during his annual Protectorate Training Test, which Dodgers routinely avoids taking. He takes great pride in molding lazy Captains (like Dodgers) into decent shape to fight for the Protectorate, enjoying their suffering during training. However, he respects individuals who can think out of the box which is why Sgt. Jones let Dodgers pass the test despite the fact Dodgers managed to fail every one of the tests. Jones was voiced by Randy Savage.

Bigfoot
In "The Six Wazillion Dollar Duck" (a parody of The Six Million Dollar Man), it was revealed that Bigfoot worked for the Protectorate as a Maintenance Supervisor and was also the first being to receive cyborgan implants. Due to enhanced combat abilities, as he was able hold off several centurions before they baited and trapped him with pie. He seems not to be very educated, as the only two words he says are "Duck" and "Stereo". When Dodgers thwarted the Martians, Dr. Maniac escaped with Bigfoot and were seen in the fast food business. On the "Bonafide Heroes" show, Dr. Maniac and Bigfoot were seen being interviewed in jail. Bigfoot was voiced by Michael Patrick McGill.

Martian Empire

Queen Tyr'ahnee

Queen Tyr'ahnee is the ruler of Mars. She is shown as a competent ruler who, much unlike the rival President of Space, actually leaves the safety of the government buildings at times. Though at times she dislikes him, she is in love with Dodgers and, just like Cadet, believes him to be a true hero. She and Dodgers planned to marry until X-2 persuaded Dodgers to leave the Queen. She never quite got over her feelings for Dodgers, to the point of deserting Commander X-2 at their own wedding. She is shown to be good friends with I.Q. Hi, knowing and calling him by his first name, Ignatius, on many occasions.

Tyr'ahnee wears outfits reminiscent of ancient Egyptian royal garb. Her name is pronounced similar to "tyranny." Like all Martians, she has a British accent.  She was voiced by Tia Carrere.

Martian Commander X-2

Martian Commander X-2 Marvin is the commander of the Martian military. He is never named outside his official capacity as the Commander (possibly High Commander) of the fleet of Mars. He essentially created Duck Dodgers by going back in time and making Dodgers a hero so as to not be proven wrong by the queen. X-2 is Duck Dodgers' archenemy, though X-2 considers Dodgers more of a nuisance than a true enemy. X-2 serves the Martian Queen Tyr'ahnee, with whom he is infatuated and loyal to. His crush is not requited for most of the series, until in the end of the second season, when the Queen kissed X2 in the cheek after learning of his crush, something he found so delighted. Even at their wedding, the Queen chooses Dodgers over X-2, even after X-2 risks his life to save Dodgers from the Legion of Duck Doom. Also, despite their rivalry with each other, both Dodgers and X-2 have worked together in several occasions to fight against more evil villains in general; Dodgers  even manages to rescue X-2 from the wrath of the treacherous Martian General Z-9.

X-2's interests include piano music, singing, cooking, and possibly linguistics. He is also shown to be obsessively tidy and an avid worker. X-2 is also an avid scientist and inventor, creating many machines that assist the stories. He is also shown to have a fear of heights due to childhood trauma and to be very protective of his mother, apparently calling or sending her messages up to five times a day. 
X-2 is also the constant target of the centurions' robot jokes, who imply several times in the series that X-2 is not alright in his head and has issues with "strong independent women" (ie. the Martian Queen).

Martian Commander X-2 was played by Marvin the Martian and was voiced by Joe Alaskey.

Commander K-9
Martian Commander K-9 is Martian Commander X-2's dog. He is loyal and loving and will do anything for his master. He'll always protect his master from danger, even if it makes K-9 look bad in front of him. K-9 is proven to be ticklish when Martian Gophers tickle his belly and chin. K-9's vocal effects were provided by Frank Welker.

Martian General Z-9
Martian General Z-9 is a well-known general of the Martian military. He serves as the villain of the final two episodes of the second season. He initially served for the Martian Queen and Martian Commander X-2, but secretly plotted to take over both Earth and Mars as their new ruler after a peace meeting between Earth and Mars went off bad thanks to Dodgers' antics. To start off, Z-9 managed to capture Star Johnson after the latter learns of the general's plot. Z-9 then staged a military coup on Mars by taking the Martian Queen as prisoner and sending X-2 on the run as a wanted criminal, declaring himself the new Martian King and Commander. Z-9 then plans to get hold of the shut-down codes of Earth's shield system by staging up a false peace treaty between Mars and Earth to finalize his invasion on Earth. Fortunately, Duck Dodgers manages to rescue Cadet, X2, and Captain Johnson and they collaborated to keep the codes away to safety and save the Queen from Z-9's grasp during a battle between Z-9's forces and Earth. Following the aftermath of the battle between Earth and Mars which ended in ceasefire, Z-9 is arrested for his treason and crimes against Mars and Earth, and sacked of his ranks. He is currently incarcerated and sharing a cell with the Andromeda Annihilator, who subjects the former general to painful torture, much to his dismay. Z-9 was voiced by Corey Burton.

Dish
Dish is a female cyborg, serving as Martian General Z-9's loyal second-in-command and counselor. She aids him into overthrowing the Martian Queen and sending X-2 on the run to finalize his takeover of Mars. She's also capable in martial arts, and is shown once able to defeat a swarm of Instant Martians with her karate skills. In a battle between Earth's forces and Z-9's forces, Dish attempts to fire at the Protectorate HQ under Z-9's orders, but the Martian Queen, being freed by Dodgers and X-2, stops her by chopping her head off, killing her for good. Cadet then uses Dish's head to knock Z-9 out into the ship's console, thus leading to the general's defeat and imprisonment for his war crimes. Dish was voiced by Tara Strong.

Martian Centurion Robots
The Martian Centurion Robots are robotic servants of the Mars Empire. They appear to be sentient, and make up a large portion of the Imperial Army, while the organic Martians act as officers. They are a homage to the Cylon Centurions of Battlestar Galactica. All Centurions were voiced by Michael Dorn.

Instant Martians
Instant Martians are strange bird-like Martian beings with purple hair. They were used briefly by Commander X-2 as an escape ploy. They emerge from minuscule seeds that are activated when they come in contact with water. They first appeared in the 1958 cartoon "Hare-Way to the Stars", in which the Marvin the Martian ordered them to capture Bugs Bunny.

Other villains

Catapoids
Catapoids are caterpillar-like aliens who take the form of girls when Duck Dodgers first encounters them. One of them appears in the Legion of Duck Doom in girl form, but has no dialogue. The Catapoids were voiced by Grey DeLisle.

Count Muerte
Count Muerte is a fat-sucking vampire who hypnotized Duck Dodgers to help him in a plot to suck the fat out of the Eager Young Space Cadet. Cadet destroyed Count Muerte by using a fat-free cheese duplicate of himself. Count Muerte returned from the dead as a member of Agent Roboto's Legion of Duck Doom. He is reminiscent of the Looney Tunes character Count Bloodcount. Muerte was voiced by Jeff Bennett.

Drake Darkstar
Drake Darkstar is a conniving maniac who resembles Duck Dodgers (except the feathers on the top of his head are tousled backwards, instead of forward like Dodgers'). During a prison visit, Drake Darkstar escaped and the guards took Duck Dodgers into custody, mistaking him for Drake. When Duck Dodgers and Drake Darkstar fought in front of the guards, their captain, and Cadet, Cadet chose Drake since "he was much nicer to him" after Dodgers absentmindedly revealed he had sold Cadet's sister to the sausage factory, an act that even Darkstar considered "cold". The only way to tell him apart from Dodgers is his British accent and evil smile. Like Dodgers, Darkstar was also voiced by Joe Alaskey.

Martian Gophers
Martian Commander X-2 and Commander K-9 encounter two six-limbed, green gophers from Mars. The Gopher King wanted to blow up Mars. K-9 kept getting in their way and they do everything to stop K-9 from succeeding. The Martian Gophers later returned to plague Duck Dodgers on a space farm.

The Martian Gophers resemble the Goofy Gophers. They were voiced by Rob Paulsen and Jess Harnell; their king was voiced by Stan Freberg.

K'Chutha Sa'am
K'Chutha Sa'am, leader of the Klunkins, first appeared in a plot to take over Earth, only to be thwarted by Cadet. The Klunkins consider cats as an appetizer. On another occasion, they fought Duck Dodgers when they were guarding spoiled pop star Lady Chanticleer of whom K'Chutha is a fan. He is last seen as a member of the Legion of Duck Doom. The Klunkins are a parody of the Klingons. K'Chutha Sa'am was played by Yosemite Sam and voiced by Maurice LaMarche.

Long John Silver the 23rd
Long John Silver the 23rd, a descendant of the original Long John Silver, leads a band of Space Pirates. He and his pirates had possession of a device called Disappearo that enables their ship to disappear without detection when robbing spaceships on the trade route. It took Duck Dodgers, Cadet, and Martian Commander X-2 (who was trying to claim the Disappearo for Mars) to thwart him, but Long John Silver the 23rd got away. He is last seen as a member of the Legion of Duck Doom. Silver was voiced by John DiMaggio.

Nasty Canasta
Nasty Canasta is an intergalactic bounty hunter. He was hired by Martian Commander X-2 to take down Duck Dodgers who was vacationing on Roboworld. Disguised as a cowboy, he took on Duck Dodgers before being defeated by the robot version of Cadet. He is later recruited into the Legion of Duck Doom. Canasta was played by himself and voiced by Kevin Michael Richardson.

Sinestro
Sinestro appears in his role as a DC Comics villain in a crossover between the two series. As in the DC Comic series, he attempts to destroy the Green Lantern Corps on Oa but is stopped by Dodgers. Sinestro was voiced by John de Lancie.

Dr. Woe
Dr. Woe is a mad scientist who is the archenemy of Martian Commander X-2. When Woe plotted to take over Mars, X-2 had to fight him in order to free Queen Tyr'ahnee only for Duck Dodgers to interfere and thwart him. He is portrayed by the mad scientist from "Water, Water Every Hare". Woe was voiced by Joe Alaskey.

Archduke Zag
Archduke Zag is Cadet's evil cousin who took over Swinus 9. When news of Cadet's return reached the planet, Archduke Zag went into hiding and resurfaced to capture Princess Incense. When Cadet and Duck Dodgers followed him to a lava river, Archduke Zag and Cadet fought with laser sabers. When Cadet won, Zag used lava-powered bracelets to conjure a lava monster to attack Cadet. Duck Dodgers and Princess Incense converted the lava monster's energy source and Archduke Zag was defeated. Zag was voiced by Clancy Brown.

Maninsuit
Maninsuit is a giant docile monster controlled by the Martians who lived on planet Niponno. Duck Dodgers, Cadet, and Rickki Roundhouse freed him from the Martians' control. Maninsuit is a parody of Godzilla; during his rampage, a parody of Godzilla's classic theme is heard as well as Godzilla's trademark roar in the background. Maninsuit's vocal effects were provided by Frank Welker.

Alien Hunter
An armored alien hunter who hunted Martian Commander X-2 and Commander K-9 when they were on their hunting trip. Alien Hunter is revealed to be Wile E. Coyote, who is still alive and still can't catch the Road Runner. He is modeled on the film character Predator. He reveals himself as a member of Legion of Duck Doom. Alien Hunter was played by Wile E. Coyote. His vocal effects were provided by Dee Bradley Baker.

Baby-Faced Moonbeam
Baby-Faced Moonbeam is an evil little boy with electromagnetic powers. He was sentenced to life imprisonment and frozen in ice 300 years ago and was supposed to stay that way. However, Dodgers thawed him out. He was eventually defeated by Dodgers, the Cadet, and Martian Commander X-2. Baby-Faced Moonbeam was last seen with other villains when Agent Roboto assembled the Legion of Duck Doom. He resembles Ralph Phillips. Moonbeam was voiced by Dick Beals who originally voiced Ralph.

New Cadet
A female cadet infiltrated Duck Dodgers' ship posing as Cadet's replacement so she could start a relationship with him. She helped Duck Dodgers thwart a plot by Martian Commander X-2. Dr. I.Q. Hi didn't know he sent a new cadet until Dodgers discovered Cadet tied up below. The two managed to escape with New Cadet setting her eyes upon Martian Commander X-2. She appears as one of the members of Legion of Duck Doom. Her real name was never revealed in either of those two episodes.

Mother Fudd
Mother Fudd is a parasitic mind-altering alien disease on a floating device. Anyone exposed to it takes on the personality of Elmer Fudd. It started to infect everyone on Earth and Mars so it can invade the sun and take over the Solar System. Duck Dodgers, Cadet, and Martian Commander X-2 were hit by a magical rock earlier that made them immune to the Fudd so they were able to work together to infiltrate the Mother Fudd's ship and stop it. When the immunity jar reversed powers, Mother Fudd reverted to Elmer Fudd. A different version of Fudd was among the villains assembled by Agent Roboto to join the Legion of Duck Doom. Mother Fudd was voiced by Billy West.

Marvin's Mother
Marvin's mother is a minor character only mentioned in The Fudd. She is mentioned when Marvin says "Mommy!" while running away.

Commandante Hilgalgo
Commandante Hilgalgo is the ruler of a California-based planet with less-advanced technology. Duck Dodgers, disguized as Xero, takes on Hilgalgo. Hilgalgo's right-hand man, Sergeant Vasquez, keeps trying to tell him that Xero and Duck Dodgers are the same. Soon, Xero and Commandante Hilgalgo engaged each other in a laser sword fight which Duck Dodgers won. He is last seen in the Legion of Duck Doom. Commandante Hilgalgo is based on the various tyrannical, corrupt commandantes featured in the Zorro stories and media adaptations. He was voiced by Carlos Alazraqui.

Tasmanian Warrior
Duck Dodgers fights a Tasmanian Devil-like lifeform that on the talking planet Masatevo. He appears in the Legion of Duck Doom. He was played by Taz and voiced by Jim Cummings.

Crusher
Portrayed by the character of the same name, Crusher is a tough surfer who is said to be the best in the universe. He challenged Duck Dodgers to a surfing contest where they tried to defeat each other. Duck Dodgers ended up winning the surf-off. He returns as a member of the Legion of Duck Doom. Crusher was voiced by John DiMaggio.

Phantom Shadow
A monster from Scooby-Doo that made a cameo in "Surf the Stars". He chase Dodgers and Crusher along with some other monsters. Phantom Shadow was voiced by Dee Bradley Baker.

Andromeda Annihilator
Andromeda Annihilator is a convict which shared a prison cell with the Cadet, who is later freed. The Annihilator is current sharing his cell with the former Martian General Z-9, whom he subjects to painful torture, much to Z-9's distraught. He was played by the Shropshire Slasher and voiced by Joe Alaskey.

Black Eel
The Black Eel is a villain in an atmospheric diving suit. He first appeared when Agent Roboto formed the Legion of Duck Doom. He is a Seaman villain who was filled in about Duck Dodgers by the other villains. He later attends the Martian Queen's wedding with Seaman (a parody of Aquaman). Both of them ended up being enemies again when the truce between Earth and Mars was over. Black Eel is a parody of Black Manta. He was voiced by Jim Cummings.

Magnificent Rogue
The Magnificent Rogue is a handsome, rich, long-haired, muscular and suave villain who is a celebrity. He plotted to flood the Earth by moving the Moon close to Earth, but was thwarted and escaped. He was voiced by Tim Curry.

Victor Von Boogieman
Victor Von Boogieman is a villain from the disco planet Groovica. He teamed with Martian Commander X-2 and the Martian Queen to steal the galaxy's supply of diamonds. He was defeated by Duck Dodgers, Cadet, and Paprika Solo. He was voiced by Jeff Bennett.

Dr. Maniac
Dr. Dick Maniac is a mad scientist who was hired by the Martians to help them with a cybernetic project. However, he was unqualified to work on the project, allowing Dodgers to thwart the Martians. It is later revealed that Dr. Maniac used to be a circus clown (which explains his lack of knowledge in technology and his usage of balloon hats filled with explosive gas as a method of torture) and happens to be a friend of Martian Commander X-2's uncle, who pressured his nephew to give Dr. Maniac a job in Mars. Dr. Maniac escaped with Bigfoot and was seen in the fast food business. On the "Bonafide Heroes" episode, Dr. Maniac and Bigfoot were seen being interviewed in jail. He was voiced by Henry Winkler.

Hubie and Bertie
Hubie and Bertie are two mice hired by the Martian Queen and Martian Commander X-2 to turn Duck Dodgers against Cadet with various pranks that the other one is blamed for. When Duck Dodgers and Cadet discover this, they use them against the Martian Queen and Martian Commander X-2. Like the original Looney Tunes characters, Hubie has a habit of picking Bertie up and slapping him if he says something wrong. However, unlike their earlier characters they are fluent in Portuguese. They were voiced by Joe Alaskey.

Skunderbelly
Skunderbelly is a gambling kingpin who hired bounty hunters to capture Duck Dodgers. He was voiced by Bob Joles.

Manobrain
Manobrain is a tentacled alien with a large brain and psychic abilities who used to be friends with I.Q. Hi. Their friendship ended in college when they blamed each other for the loss of a prototype weight-loss pill they invented. Monobrain became a criminal mastermind and resurfaced to steal the secret codes that were to be used in the event that the President of Outer Space accidentally locked himself in his walk-in closet. He hid the codes inside Duck Dodgers' brain and had to help I.Q. Hi, Cadet, and Duck Dodgers' egos recover it before the President ran out of air. While in Dodger's brain they realize that Duck Dodgers stole their weight loss pill.

I.Q. Hi and Manobrain ended up renewing their feud when the fresh breath pill they invented goes missing, again at the hands of Dodgers. Manobrain was voiced by Lewis Black.

Whoosh
Whoosh is an orangutan-like alien. He used a Gibbon Fist Kung Fu move in his crimes. Duck Dodgers, Cadet, and Master Moloch defeat him, but a Commander X-2 reveals information on Whoosh's special martial arts move to a villain's dojo while one of its students. Woosh was voiced by Brian Tochi.

Serpenti Crime Family
The Serpenti Crime Family are snake-like aliens who make up a crime family. It is led by twin brothers Royal and Roy Serpenti. They were known to have ruined Rocky's opportunity to rob a bank. It was said that they stole the universe's supply of Bubba Looney gum. To get close to them, Duck Dodgers and Cadet worked with Rocky and Mugsy to form a crime family only for the Serpenti Crime Family to end up arrested in the end. Royal Serpenti was voiced by Burt Reynolds and Roy Serpenti was voiced by Dom DeLuise.

Camoman
Camoman is a supervillain who can blend into his surroundings unless they are plaid. He infiltrated Dodgers' ship when the "Bonefide Heroes" show was filming Duck Dodgers so that Camoman could be on TV. His head shape resembles Elmer Fudd. Camoman was voiced by Jeff Garlin.

Other characters

Happy Cat
Happy Cat is a corporate mascot for a large line of products. Happy Cat makes numerous appearances throughout the series, often in a background role, though he takes on the role of a villain in one episode as "Achu the Wizard." Dodgers has a Happy Cat alarm clock by his bed, given to him by the Cadet for Christmas, which often taunts him into getting up. Dodgers frequently tries to destroy the clock in comedic fashion (smashing it with a hammer or golf club, or kicking it and stomping on it) but it continues to operate. He speaks with a raspy Japanese accent.

Happy Cat's catch phrase is a mirthless "HA! HA! HA!". This phrase and the character's name parodies Aku the Wizard from the Cartoon Network animated series Samurai Jack, which Dodgers portrays. Happy Cat's vocal effects were provided by veteran actor Mako.

Agent Yoshimi
Agent Nikki Yoshimi is a Japanese special agent assigned by the President of Outer Space to organize freedom fighters to liberate the planet Andromeda 6, in the Beta Carotene System, from Martian Centurion Robots. Dodgers and the Cadet are to transport Yoshimi to the planet. Dodgers fell into unrequited love with her (who remained oblivious to his advances throughout the entire episode) at first sight but by the end of the mission, she'd fallen in love with a freedom fighter named Dax. Dodgers decided that spending the rest of his life with her may not be the best way to live and "breaks up" with her. Her name might come from the concept album Yoshimi Battles the Pink Robots by The Flaming Lips, who composed the show's opening theme.

The President of Space
The titular ruler of the Galactic Protectorate, The President of Space is shown to be more of a figurehead ruler than a capable one; most business is taken care of by I.Q. Hi. The President, a tall, muscular man, is also far less suited for his job than the Protectorate's rival, Queen Tyr'ahnee. He is married to the First Lady, who he tends to mock when she isn't around.

Agent Roboto
Agent Roboto is a robot created by Dr. I.Q. Hi to assist Duck Dodgers and Cadet when the Martians' Space Station was firing a laser. Agent Roboto proved to be very good at saving lives, which led to Dodgers planning to get rid of him. He ended up destroyed. He later returned with a vengeance by forming the Legion of Duck Doom and attempted to attack Duck Dodgers and Cadet at Carlsbad Caverns. When Agent Roboto realised he was blinded by rage, he left to warn Duck Dodgers about the Legion's plan. He sacrificed himself to save Duck Dodgers from a meteor heading toward Mars. This scene and its dialogue were heavily based on the ending scene of the film The Iron Giant. Roboto was voiced by Kevin Michael Richardson.

Lezah the Wicked
Lezah the Wicked was a character in a virtual MMORPG. In the game, she sent Dodgers' character on a quest to save a princess, which turned out to be Lezah herself. She said that while she was imprisoned, only her spirit could wander the lands. The character resembles Witch Hazel. In contrast to her hideous appearance, her player is quite attractive. The fact that the character was turned into a beautiful woman near the end, thanks to Dodgers using a scepter from another character, is a reference to "Broom-Stick Bunny". Lezah the Wicked was voiced by June Foray, who voiced Witch Hazel.

Dr. Psy Q. Hi
Dr. Psy Q. Hi is the brother of Dr. I.Q. Hi and a therapist. He was voiced by John Billingsley.

Steve Boston
Known as "The Six Wazillion Dollar Man", he trained Duck Dodgers to master his cybernetic parts and assisted him in thwarting the Martian's plot that involved people with cybernetic parts. A parody of Steve Austin, The Six Million Dollar Man. He was voiced by Chris Edgerly.

Chancellor Flippauralius and King Great White
On the planet Aquarium Chancellor Flippauralius is the ruler of the Dophinites and King Great White is the ruler of the Sharkarians. While Flippauralius is a fan of classical music, King Great White prefers rock (the latter may be a reference to the rock band Great White). When Dodgers and Cadet were visiting that planet on a diplomatic mission, they sided with opposing rulers on their musical opinions. This almost broke out into a civil war until both races shared the habit of making sure their planet doesn't break. After Duck Dodgers rammed their ship into Aquarium (though it was miraculously fixed), he and Cadet were suspended for causing civil war to break out and almost destroying Aquarium. King Great White and Chancellor Flippauralius have also informed the Galactic Protectorate that if Duck Dodgers and Cadet visit Aquarium again, they will be "filleted." Chancellor Flippauralius was voiced by James Patrick Stuart while King Great White was voiced by John DiMaggio.

Rona Vipra
Rona Vipra is a bounty hunter originally hired by Skunderbelly, but allied with Duck Dodgers. She was voiced by Paget Brewster

Hungortus
Hungortus is an alien entity with seemingly limitless cosmic powers, forced to consume planets—via a mouth on his stomach—to sustain himself. He is a parody of the Marvel Comics' character Galactus.

Flame Valet
Flame Valet is a fiery lawyer who serves as the Herald of Hungortus. Earth used him to convince Hungortus to eat Mars, even though Flame Valet never won a case and by his own admission, he never even went to law school. He is a parody of one of Galactus' Heralds, Firelord. He was voiced by Tom Kenny.

Counselor Combustion
Counselor Combustion, the sister of Flame Valet, is also a lawyer. She has a sibling rivalry with Flame. Mars used her to convince Hungortus to eat Earth. She could be a parody of another Herald of Galactus, Frankie Raye.

Master Moloch
Master Moloch is a gibbon-like alien who trains Protectorate Agents. He is a master of the Gibbon Fist Kung Fu move. He trained Duck Dodgers and Cadet with the move when they had to fight the Whoosh.

Princess Incense
Princess Incense is seen in the episode "Pig Planet". She was played by the fictional character Petunia Pig, and voiced by Jodi Benson. Physically she seemes to be based on Princess Jasmine from Disney's Aladdin.

Rocky and Mugsy
Duck Dodgers and Cadet hired Rocky and Mugsy to help form a crime family in order to get close to the Serpenti Crime Family. It was mentioned that the Serpenti Crime Family ruined Rocky's first bank robbery job. Rocky was voiced by Joe Alaskey and Mugsy was voiced by Kevin Michael Richardson.

Dave Mustaine
Dave Mustaine is the vocalist and guitarist of the heavy metal band Megadeth. He appears as himself in the episode In Space, No One Can Hear You Rock. In the episode he appears to be frozen by cryogenics (a possible reference to his band's song, "Hangar 18"). Later he is unfrozen and defeats Tyr'Ahnee by playing "Back in the Day" and destroying the Martian Ships with the sound of his music.

Porko, Puerco and Sow
The Cadet's niece and nephews who only appeared in the episode, "Pig Planet", and were mentioned in "Duck Departure". Porko was voiced by Rob Paulsen; Puerco was voiced by Jess Harnell; Sow was voiced by Tress MacNeille.

Cassiopeia
Cassiopeia is a pop star that Dodgers lusts after. He tries to impress her but fails miserably, ultimately setting her hair on fire and she kicks him out of her room. In a scene only used in European airings, she eventually forgives him and has banter with him.
She is physically similar to Jem from Jem and the Holograms and is voiced by Jane Wiedlin.

References

Duck Dodgers
Characters